Madhuca fulva is a species of plant in the family Sapotaceae. It is endemic to Sri Lanka. It is known as "වන මල් - wana mal" by Sinhalese people.

References

Flora of Sri Lanka
fulva
Vulnerable plants
Taxonomy articles created by Polbot